"No Puedo Olvidar" ("I Can't Forget") is a song by Latin pop boy band MDO from their second studio album Un Poco Más (1999). It was released as the second single from the album in 1999. The track became their first number one on both the Hot Latin Songs and Latin Pop Airplay charts in the United States. Two versions of the song were recorded, one in pop and one in ballad.

Charts

See also 
List of number-one Billboard Hot Latin Tracks of 1999
List of Billboard Latin Pop Airplay number ones of 1999

References

1999 singles
1999 songs
1990s ballads
MDO (band) songs
Pop ballads
Spanish-language songs
Sony Discos singles
Songs written by Tommy Torres